Stephen O. Gangluff (born September 6, 1975) is an American professional golfer.

Gangluff was born in Marysville, Ohio. He played college golf at Ohio State University. He turned professional in 1996.

Gangluff played on the Nationwide Tour in 2003, 2004, 2007, and 2011. His best finish was T-3 at the 2007 Preferred Health Systems Wichita Open. He also played on the Canadian Tour, winning three times and leading the Order of Merit in 2006. He played on the PGA Tour in 2002 and 2012, both times earning his card through Q School. His best finish is T-19 at the 2002 FedEx St. Jude Classic.

After failing to get any noticeable results in the U.S., Gangluff returned to the Canadian Tour. He won the season's first event of 2013, the Times Colonist Island Savings Open.

Professional wins (6)

PGA Tour Canada wins (4)

Other wins (2)
2018 Ohio Open
2019 Ohio Open

See also
2001 PGA Tour Qualifying School graduates
2011 PGA Tour Qualifying School graduates

References

External links

American male golfers
Ohio State Buckeyes men's golfers
PGA Tour golfers
Golfers from Ohio
Golfers from Virginia
People from Marysville, Ohio
Sportspeople from Charlottesville, Virginia
1975 births
Living people